The Women's Columbia round open was one of the events held in archery at the 1960 Summer Paralympics in Rome.

There were only three competitors - representing Belgium and Great Britain. According to the International Paralympic Committee's records, the Belgian competitor was Marc de Vos. This is the name of a male Belgian track and field Paralympian from the early 1980s, and "Marc" is a male given name, so this may be an error in the IPC database.

Margaret Maughan of Great Britain was a clear winner with 484 points. The Belgian archer took silver with 437, while British archer Gubbin (full name not recorded) finished almost a hundred points behind her compatriot to take bronze.

References 

M
Para